Pleurodema guayapae is a species of frog in the family Leptodactylidae.
It is found in Argentina and Bolivia.
Its natural habitats are temperate shrubland, subtropical or tropical dry shrubland, subtropical or tropical dry lowland grassland, subtropical or tropical seasonally wet or flooded lowland grassland, intermittent freshwater marshes, and pastureland.

References

Pleurodema
Taxonomy articles created by Polbot
Amphibians described in 1964